The tambori is a percussion instrument of about 10 centimetres diameter, a small shallow cylinder formed of metal or wood with a drumhead of skin. Its usual function is to accompany the playing of the flabiol in a cobla band, beating the rhythm of the sardana, the traditional dance of Catalonia.

It is attached to the elbow of the left arm and struck with a little drumstick called a broqueta held by the right hand, while the flabiol can be played at the same time with the left hand.

See also
Pipe and tabor

External links
El testament n'Amèlia Video of a performance of this sardana (composer Joan Lamote de Grignon) by the cobla "Comptat d'Empúries" at the Castelló d'Empúries.  The flabiol player can be seen tapping the tamborí after playing the theme tune as an extended introduction.

European percussion instruments
Catalan musical instruments
Spanish musical instruments
Andorran musical instruments
Sardana